Kroje (pronounced "kro-yeh") (singular: kroj) are folk costumes worn by Czechs and Slovaks. Gothic influence is seen in tying shawls and kerchiefs on the head. Fine pleats and gathered lace collars typify the Renaissance era. From Baroque bell-shaped skirts to delicate Slavic patterns, these folk costumes show the complex growth of Czech and Slovak traditions.

Types
Kroje had many regional variants with typical decorations and/or colours. There are three basic types of kroj: 
 the simple one, used in everyday life that looks very similar in all regions.
 the celebration one, used for Sunday masses, feasts etc.
 the wedding one - used only by a bride or a groom. As it was not reasonable to have a one-purpose clothing, it was often a celebration one upgraded by typical wedding accessories.

Kroje are not worn by people in the Czech Republic and Slovakia anymore, only during feasts people use them as a living tradition.

Kroje started being replaced by modern clothing during the 19th century: it started in bigger cities, and towns and villages followed. It was quicker in Bohemia and industrial regions and of course for male clothing, so on the old photos it is possible to see a father in a suit, but a mother (and possibly children) in a kroj. The last regions where kroje were worn on everyday or almost everyday basis were regions near the border between Moravia and Slovakia – Moravian Slovakia, Horňácko, Moravian Wallachia - where there was possible to meet esp. old women wearing kroje even in the second half of 20th century.

Gallery

Sources
A promotional brochure from the National Czech & Slovak Museum & Library

Slovak clothing
Folk costumes
Czech culture